Kerry Hyder Jr. (born May 2, 1991) is an American football defensive end for the San Francisco 49ers of the National Football League (NFL). He played college football for Texas Tech.

High school career
Hyder played linebacker and defensive end for Lyndon B. Johnson High School in Austin, TX. Hyder was ranked as a 3-star prospect by Rivals.com and held offers from Cincinnati, Iowa State, Minnesota, New Mexico, Texas Tech, Toledo, and Utah.

College career
Hyder accepted a scholarship offer to play for Texas Tech in 2009 and redshirted his freshman season. In his redshirt freshman season in 2010, Hyder played in 11 games, and logged 13 tackles and 3.5 tackles for loss.

In 2011, Hyder started all 12 games for the Red Raiders and logged 42 tackles, 5 tackles for loss, 1.5 sacks, and one forced fumble.

The 2012 season proved to be Hyder's breakout year with four organizations naming him to preseason All-Big 12 Conference lists. Hyder concluded the season with All-Big 12 Conference honors from Phil Steele, the Austin-American Statesman, the Associated Press, and CBS Sports, among others.

Hyder's senior season in 2013 began with pre-season All-Big 12 Conference listings by several organizations, as well as listings on the Lombardi Award, Bronko Nagurski Award and Outland Trophy watchlists. Hyder's senior season concluded with several All-Big 12 conference selections. Hyder logged 65 tackles, 11.5 tackles for loss, 2 sacks, 3 forced fumbles, 2 blocked kicks, one pass defensed and one fumble recovery.

He finished his college career with  49 games (41 starts), 176 tackles, 11 sacks, 10 passes defensed, 3 forced fumbles and 2 fumble recoveries.

Professional career

New York Jets
On May 11, 2014, the New York Jets signed Hyder to a three-year, $1.53 million contract as an undrafted free agent defensive tackle after he was not selected during the 2014 NFL Draft. His contract included a signing bonus of $4,000. He was released on August 30, 2014 and signed to the team's practice squad a day later.

Detroit Lions
Hyder was signed to a reserve/future contract on January 6, 2015. Hyder did not make the final 53 man roster out of training camp but was resigned to the practice squad after clearing waivers. In the offseason before the 2016 season, Hyder shed 35 pounds and transitioned to defensive end. He was promoted to the active roster on January 2, 2016. After recording three sacks in the Lions final preseason game in 2016, Hyder made the Lions 53-man roster. In the first game of the regular season, Hyder recorded two sacks on Indianapolis Colts quarterback Andrew Luck as the Lions won 39-35. Hyder recorded 1.5 sacks in Week 2. After an ankle injury to all-pro defensive end Ezekiel Ansah, Hyder made his first career NFL start on September 25, 2016 against the Green Bay Packers in Week 3, recording another sack. Hyder was nominated as the pre-game Gruden Grinder before a Monday night tilt with the Dallas Cowboys by broadcaster Jon Gruden on December 26, 2016. Hyder finished his breakout 2016 season with eight sacks, leading the Lions in both sacks and tackles for loss. Hyder was named the 2016 Detroit Lions Media-Friendly "Good Guy Award" winner by members of the Pro Football Writers Association and Detroit Sports Media Association.

In the Lions first 2017 preseason game, Hyder suffered a torn Achilles, ending his 2017 season. He was placed on injured reserve on August 15, 2017.

On March 10, 2018, the Lions re-signed Hyder to a one-year contract extension.

Dallas Cowboys
On March 18, 2019, the Dallas Cowboys signed Hyder to a one-year, $1 million contract that included $300,000 guaranteed and a signing bonus of $100,000. In week 7 against the Philadelphia Eagles, Hyder recovered a fumble lost by Carson Wentz in the 37–10 win. He was a backup, appearing in all 16 games, while posting 19 tackles (2 for loss), one sack, 19 quarterback pressures and one fumble recovery.

San Francisco 49ers
On March 25, 2020, the San Francisco 49ers signed Hyder to a one-year, $1.50 million contract that included $550,000 guaranteed. In Week 12 against the Los Angeles Rams, Hyder recorded two sacks on Jared Goff and recovered a fumble lost by Goff during the 23–20 win. He ended the season with a career high 8.5 sacks.

Seattle Seahawks
On March 25, 2021, the Seattle Seahawks signed Hyder to a two-year, $6.80 million contract, that includes $3.65 million guaranteed and a signing bonus of $2.55 million. He was released on March 18, 2022.

San Francisco 49ers (second stint)
On March 24, 2022, Hyder signed a one-year contract with the San Francisco 49ers.

References

Living people
1991 births
American football defensive ends
Players of American football from Austin, Texas
African-American players of American football
Texas Tech Red Raiders football players
Detroit Lions players
New York Jets players
Dallas Cowboys players
San Francisco 49ers players
Seattle Seahawks players
21st-century African-American sportspeople
Ed Block Courage Award recipients